Yusuf Ziya Pasha (1849 – 1929), also known as Youssouf Zia Pacha, was an Ottoman politician and government minister, who was one of the figureheads of the Committee of Union and Progress (CUP). He was the Ottoman ambassador to the United States from June 14, 1910 to 1914.

His residence was Perili Köşk in Constantinople (now Istanbul) (originally known as the Yusuf Ziya Pasha Mansion). The building currently houses the headquarters of Borusan and the Borusan Contemporary art museum.

References

1849 births
1929 deaths
Politicians of the Ottoman Empire
Committee of Union and Progress politicians
Ambassadors of the Ottoman Empire to the United States